Vespula alascensis, also referred to as common yellowjacket, is a species of yellowjacket that inhabits North America. Although it was named in 1870, it was, until 2010, treated as a taxonomic synonym of a related species, Vespula vulgaris, but is now recognized as a distinct taxon. Generally it nests in the ground.

References

 Bugguide.net. Species Vespula alascensis

External Links 

 

Vespidae
Insects described in 1870